North Hill may refer to:

Anguilla
North Hill, Anguilla, a district

United Kingdom
North Hill, Cornwall, a village in England
North Hill, Malvern, an elevation
North Hill, Orkney, an RSPB nature reserve

United States
North Hill (Riverside, California), a hill
North Hill (Plymouth), a neighborhood in Plymouth, Massachusetts
North Hill, Minot, North Dakota, a neighborhood
North Hill (Albany County, New York), a mountain
North Hill Historic District (disambiguation), two places
North Hill Preservation District, Pensacola, Florida

See also
North Hills (disambiguation)